The 2011 Purdue Boilermakers football team represented Purdue University in the 2011 NCAA Division I FBS football season. Under third-year head coach Danny Hope, Purdue compiled a record of 7–6 and finished in third place in the newly formed Leaders Division of the Big Ten Conference. They played their home games at Ross–Ade Stadium in West Lafayette, Indiana and are members of the Big Ten Conference. Highlights of Purdue's 2011 season included a 21–14 victory over #21 Illinois, a 26–23 overtime victory over Ohio State, and the first bowl game since 2007.  Purdue's season ended with a 37–32 victory against Western Michigan in the 2011 Little Caesars Pizza Bowl.

The Special teams unit for the 2011 season was a key factor in many of the Boilermakers games as they averaged a school-record 28.7 yards per kick-off return. The team title was the first since the 1954 Boilermakers led the NCAA in any yardage category for an entire season, and is merely the third team title in school history (also passing defense in 1941). True freshman Raheem Mostert was a key contributor, as he averaged 33.5 yards a return, capped off with a 99-yard touchdown return in the bowl game. He finished the season with seven returns of 39 or more yards, including an 81-yarder at Indiana and a 74-yarder at Wisconsin. Against the Badgers, he racked up 206 yards on five kickoff returns to break 42-year-old school records for total yardage and average yards per return.

Before the season
The Boilermakers are looking to improve on a 4–8 record (2–6 in conference play) in 2010, in which they finished 9th in the Big Ten conference. The offense will be aided by the return of junior running back, Ralph Bolden, who is returning from a torn ACL but led the team in rushing yards back in 2009. Their running back depth will be tested, as the running back with the most yards who was still had eligibility remaining, Al-Terek McBurse transferred out of Purdue. Rob Henry was named the starting quarterback in the preseason, but tore his ACL on August 23, and will miss the entire 2011 season. The quarterback play will be split between Robert Marve and Caleb TerBush. The receiving core returns its 2010 leader in touchdowns, Antavian Edison, as well as O. J. Ross who saw significant playing time during the 2010 season as a true freshman. On the defense the departure of Ryan Kerrigan, who was selected in the first round of the 2011 NFL Draft, will be a tough hole to fill, but will be aided by the return of Kawann Short, the team's top returning sack man. The linebacking group returns all three starters from a season ago, which includes 2 of the team's top 3 tacklers in 2010, Dwayne Beckford and Joe Holland. The secondary also returns all its starters, led by 2010 leading tackler, Logan Link and Ricardo Allen. The Boilermakers are looking to return to a bowl game for the first time since 2007.

Recruiting

Schedule

Roster

Depth chart

Coaching staff

Game summaries

Middle Tennessee State

In the opening game of the season, Purdue hosted the Middle Tennessee State Blue Raiders. It was the first time that the two universities have played each other in football.

There was a great bit of uncertainty going into the game as Purdue was going into their first game without starting quarterback, and captain, Rob Henry, and backup quarterback Robert Marve was still not healthy from an ACL injury. This led to redshirt junior, Caleb TerBush making the first start of his career. TerBush had not played since 2009 when he was the backup to Joey Elliott, and he missed the 2010 season with academic problems.

The Blue Raiders got off to an early lead when Logan Kilgore found Malcolm Beyah for a 26-yard touchdown pass. Carson Wiggs added a field goal as Purdue's response score to make it 7–3 at the end of the 1st quarter.

Purdue grabbed its first lead of the game when Caleb TerBush's rollout pass found Jared Crank for a 2-yard score. The touchdown pass was the first of TerBush's career. The Blue Raiders responded two possessions later, as Logan Kilgore's wide receiver screen pass to Sancho McDonald was taken 21-yards for a score after McDonald was able to dodge a defender. The first half ended with the Boilermakers trailing 14–10.

After no one scored in the 3rd quarter, Middle Tennessee St., opened up the 2nd half scoring with a 42-yard field goal by Alan Gendreau. Purdue responded with a 30-yard touchdown run by Akeem Shavers to tie the game at 17. The Blue Raiders responded quickly as they capped a 60-yard drive, with a 2-yard draw run by Benny Cunningham to reclaim the lead. Purdue was able to get another field goal as Carson Wiggs connected on a 47-yarder to make it 24–20 with 5:57 remaining in the game. The Boilermaker defense was able to force a punt, which allowed Purdue to get the ball back with 3:53 left in the game. TerBush led the Boilers down the field and eventually found Antavian Edison with a 35-yard crossing route to give Purdue the lead, 27–24 with 49 seconds remaining. The Blue Raiders drove the ball down to the Purdue 30-yard line, and took a shot with a deep pass. Kilgore's pass hit off the fingertips of Beyah and fell harmlessly out of bounds with 5 seconds remaining. The Blue Raiders then decided to go for the tie, but Gendreau's 47-yard attempt was blocked by Ricardo Allen as time expired.

Rice

The Owls started the scoring in the first quarter with a 33-yard field goal by Chris Boswell. Purdue responded with an 80-yard drive, capped off with a 5-yard Caleb TerBush run, to give Purdue the lead. Rice responded with a 2-yard touchdown run by Turner Petersen to start the second quarter scoring. Carson Wiggs added a 28-yard field goal to make the score even at 10. After a quick 3 and out by Rice, Purdue scored on a 19-yard reception by Crosby Wright to regain the lead. Rice then scored on a 4-yard touchdown pass by Taylor McHargue to Luke Willson as time expired to tie the game at 17.

Rice received the ball to start the 2nd half, and scored on a 19-yard run by Sam McGuffie to finished off an 11-play, 80-yard drive, and gave the Owls' their first lead since the 1st quarter. Later in the quarter, Purdue had driven down to the Rice 1-yard line, but could not get the ball in the endzone and turn it over on downs. The first play after Rice took over, Purdue tackled Charles Ross in the endzone for a safety to make the score 24–19 in favor of Rice. Wiggs added a 27-yard field goal with 7:56 remaining in the game. Purdue's defense remained strong on the next 2 drives, forcing Rice to punt each time. The Boilermakers got the ball on their own 48 with 1:52 remaining, and three long runs by Ralph Bolden moved them inside the 20. With 31 seconds remaining, Purdue ran Akeem Shavers to center the ball in the middle of the field. This set up a 4 & 10 on the Rice 14-yard line. Without a timeout remaining, Purdue was able to run out the special teams unit and get set without any of the players being rushed. Rice's Justin Allen then blocked Wiggs' 31-yard field-goal attempt as time expired, to clinch a 24–22 victory over Purdue.

SE Missouri St.

In the first ever meeting between the Redhawks and the Boilermakers, the Boilermakers did not have much trouble as they were able to defeat the Redhawks 59–0. The Purdue offense came out with early struggles, as they punted on their first possession and lost an O.J. Ross fumble on their second. Their 3rd drive was better, as they got their scoring started with a 19-yard Carson Wiggs field goal. After that, the Boilermakers power run game took over as Akeem Shavers scored twice in the first quarter on runs of 8 and 1 yards, Ralph Bolden scored twice in the seconds quarter on runs of 1 and 6 yards, and Akeem Hunt had two more scores on runs of 13 and 3 yards in the 4th. The team also welcomed back Robert Marve, who was returning to action for the first time since the 4th game of 2010, when he left the game after tearing his ACL. Marve delivered a touchdown on his first drive as he threw a 5-yard score to Gary Bush. Antavian Edison also added a 15-yard touchdown run in the 3rd quarter, as the Purdue offense ran for 393 yards (A Danny Hope era high).

Notre Dame

Minnesota

Penn State

Illinois

Michigan

Purdue scored its only points of the first half when Caleb TerBush threw a 48-yard TD pass to Gary Bush. Michigan dominated the game following the Purdue score. The Wolverines responded to Purdue's touchdown with a touchdown of their own, a 2-yard run by Denard Robinson, which was its fifth consecutive opening drive TD. In the second quarter, Michigan scored a safety when Mike Martin tackled Caleb TerBush in the end zone. A few minutes later, Michigan's Brendan Gibbons kicked a 37-yard field goal. Michigan added more points with a 2-yard TD run by Fitzgerald Toussaint. The final score of the first half was a 22-yard Michigan field goal with no time left on the clock. After the intermission, Michigan scored the only points of the third quarter when Fitzgerald Toussaint scored his second TD of the game, this time on a 59-yard rush. The teams traded scores in the final quarter. First Michigan's Michael Shaw ran in a TD from 37 yards out, which was followed by Robert Marve throwing a 19-yard TD pass to O.J. Ross. With the win, Michigan's record against Purdue improved to 43–14.

Wisconsin

Ohio State

Iowa

Indiana

Statistics

Team

Scores by quarter

Offense

Rushing

Passing

Receiving

Defense

Special teams

After the season

2012 NFL Draft

Comments
At the conclusion of the regular season, Purdue had clinched its first bowl appearance since the 2007 season. Their 6–6 record (4–4 in the Big Ten) placed them 7th in the conference and earned a spot in the 2011 Little Caesars Pizza Bowl against Western Michigan.

Awards
2nd Team All-Big Ten (Coaches vote)
Kicker – Carson Wiggs
Defensive Lineman – Kawann Short
Defensive Back – Ricardo Allen
Punter – Cody Webster

Honorable Mention All-Big Ten (Coaches vote)
Dennis Kelly
Joe Holland

2nd Team All-Big Ten (Media vote)
Punter – Cody Webster

Honorable Mention All-Big Ten (Media vote)
Ricardo Allen
Dwayne Beckford
Joe Holland
Dennis Kelly
Carson Wiggs

Big Ten Sportsmanship Award Honoree
Joe Holland

Source

References

Purdue
Purdue Boilermakers football seasons
Little Caesars Pizza Bowl champion seasons
Purdue Boilermakers football